Chang Chih-chia (born 6 May 1980) is a Taiwanese baseball player who competed in the 2004 Summer Olympics and in the 2008 Summer Olympics.

He has pitched professionally with the Seibu Lions of Nippon Professional Baseball and the La New Bears of the Chinese Professional Baseball League.

References

External links

1980 births
Living people
Baseball players at the 2004 Summer Olympics
Baseball players at the 2008 Summer Olympics
La New Bears players
Olympic baseball players of Taiwan
Nippon Professional Baseball pitchers
People from Changhua County
Seibu Lions players
Taiwanese expatriate baseball players in Japan
Match fixers
Sportspeople convicted of crimes
Taiwanese criminals